Dimitrie Cărăuş (born 14 April 1892, Sevirova, Soroca county - died 20th century) student, member of the Sfatul Țării and later victim (1940-1941), one of the many victims of Soviet communism.

Biography 
He served as Member of the Moldovan Parliament (1917–1918). On 27 March 1918, when he was a student, Dimitrie Cărăuş voted the Union of Bessarabia with Romania.

Family
He was married and had a daughter who died in infancy.

Gallery

Bibliography 
Gheorghe E. Cojocaru, Sfatul Țării: itinerar, Civitas, Chişinău, 1998, 
Mihai Taşcă, Sfatul Țării şi actualele autorităţi locale, "Timpul de dimineaţă", no. 114 (849), June 27, 2008 (page 16)

External links 
 Arhiva pentru Sfatul Tarii
 Deputaţii Sfatului Ţării şi Lavrenti Beria

Notes

Moldovan MPs 1917–1918
Year of death missing
1892 births